Kingsland is an unincorporated community located within Lyndhurst Township in Bergen County, New Jersey, United States. and the site of Kingsland station. The Kingsland Avenue Bridge is nearby.

History
The Kingsland family possessed a large tract of land in the area known as Kingsland Manor. on what was known as New Barbadoes Neck.

In 1872, the Delaware, Lackawanna and Western Railroad established a railway through the township, and erected a depot in the settlement named 
"Kingsland" in honor of the family.  A railroad shop was built, and houses erected for the railroad employees.  Church services were held in the train depot.

Kingsland had a post office.

References

Lyndhurst, New Jersey
Unincorporated communities in Bergen County, New Jersey
Unincorporated communities in New Jersey